Coulaines is a commune in the Sarthe department in the Pays de la Loire region in north-western France. Its sister city is Kitty Hawk, North Carolina, United States.

Population

See also
 Communes of the Sarthe department
 Treaty of Coulaines

References

Communes of Sarthe